This three-CD reissue of Wheat's first two albums includes a disc of rarities entitled 30 Minute Theatrik (Scanning the Garden). It was released in early 2009.

Track listing
Medeiros (1997)
 "Preprise" – 1:30
 "Death Car" – 3:19
 "Karmic Episodes"  – 3:22
 "Tubesoft" – 3:44
 "Soft Polluted Blacks" – 4:08
 "Summer" – 6:46
 "Leslie West" – 4:13
 "Girl Singer" – 4:35
 "Working Man's Manifesto" – 4:42
 "Reprise" – 1:09

Hope and Adams (1999)
 "This Wheat"  – 1:51
 "Slow Fade"  – 1:39
 "Don't I Hold You"  – 3:50
 "Raised Ranch Revolution" – 4:41
 "San Diego" – 2:51
 "No One Ever Told Me" – 2:16
 "Be Brave" – 4:17
 "Who's the One" – 4:40
 "Off the Pedestal" – 3:11
 "And Someone With Strengths" – 3:50
 "Body Talk [Part 1]" – 2:35
 "Body Talk [Part 2]" – 3:08
 "More Than You'll Ever Know" – 2:52
 "Roll the Road" – 2:11

30 Minute Theatrik (Scanning the Garden) (2009)
 "30 Minute Intro/We Will Rock" – 2:59
 "The Closer I Get 2 U" – 2:21
 "Long Shadow, U.S.A." – 4:37
 "Heaven Has" – 5:11
 "Slow Roads" – 3:36
 "Intermission" – 0:29
 "Test Tones" – 3:22
 "New Boyfriend" – 2:52
 "I've Walked Away From Things a Lot Bigger Than This" – 3:12
 "Theme Mavaras" – 3:50
 "Show Stopper" – 0:18

All songs written by Wheat. Mastered by Eric Baird at Half Son of Audio (Attleboro, Mass.). Track notes: 1) "Girl voice by Sara Søvsø Szocska Hansen, recorded by Kenny Nielsen (sp?)"; "We Will Rock" mixed by Brian Deck at Clava (Chicago, Ill.); 2) recorded and mixed by Dave Auchenbach at Pain and Pleasure (Providence, R.I.); 3) recorded by Auchenbach, mixed by Deck; 4) from the vinyl edition of Medeiros; recorded by Auchenbach, mixed by Deck; 5) demo recorded by Wheat at home; 6) audio of Bob Dubrow of WMBR (Cambridge, Mass.) "waiting for Wheat"; 7) demo for the Flaming Lips recorded by Wheat at home; 8) recorded by Wheat at home; 9) recorded and mixed by Rick Lescault at Electric Ali (Fairhaven, Mass.); 10) demo by Kenneth Madaras.

References

2009 albums
Wheat (band) albums